Ernest Allen Emerson II (born June 2, 1954), better known as E. Allen Emerson, is an American computer scientist and winner of the 2007 Turing Award. He is Professor and Regents Chair Emeritus at the University of Texas at Austin, United States.

Emerson is credited together with Edmund M. Clarke and Joseph Sifakis for the invention and
development of model checking, a technique used in formal verification of software and hardware.
His contributions to temporal logic and modal logic include the introduction of computation tree logic (CTL) and its extension CTL*, which are used in the verification of concurrent systems.
He is also credited along with others for developing symbolic model checking to address combinatorial explosion that arises in many model checking algorithms.

Early life and education

Emerson was born in Dallas, Texas. His early experiences with computing included exposure to BASIC, Fortran, and ALGOL 60 on the Dartmouth Time Sharing System and Burroughs large systems computers.
He went on to receive a Bachelor of Science degree in mathematics from the University of Texas at Austin in 1976 and a Doctor of Philosophy degree in applied mathematics at Harvard University in 1981.

Career

In the early 1980s, Emerson and his PhD advisor, Edmund M. Clarke, developed techniques for verifying a finite-state system against a formal specification. They coined the term model checking for the concept, which was independently studied by Joseph Sifakis in Europe. This sense of the word model matches the usage from model theory in mathematical logic: the system is called a model of the specification.

Emerson's work on model checking included early and influential temporal logics for describing specifications, and techniques for reducing state space explosion.

Awards

In 2007, Emerson, Clarke, and Sifakis won the Turing award. The citation reads:

In addition to the Turing award, Emerson received the 1998 ACM Paris Kanellakis Award,
together with Randal Bryant, Clarke, and Kenneth L. McMillan for the development of symbolic model checking. The citation reads:

See also
 List of pioneers in computer science

References

External links
 E. Allen Emerson homepage at the University of Texas at Austin
 

Living people
University of Texas at Austin College of Natural Sciences alumni
Harvard University alumni
University of Texas at Austin faculty
American computer scientists
Turing Award laureates
Formal methods people
1954 births